The 2018 BIG3 season was the second season of BIG3. The regular season began on June 22, 2018 and ended on August 10, 2018.

Prior to this season, BIG3 signed a streaming deal with Facebook.

Venues

Draft
The draft lottery was held on April 3, 2018 in Los Angeles. The Ball Hogs came up with the winning ping pong ball and landed the first overall pick. 

BIG3 co-founder Ice Cube and commissioner Clyde Drexler joined Skip Bayless, Shannon Sharpe and Joy Taylor on Fox Sports 1’s Skip and Shannon: Undisputed to make the announcement.

The 2018 BIG3 draft was held in Los Angeles on April 12, 2018. 19 players were selected across three rounds.

Player selections

Notes

Regular season

Week 1 (Houston, TX)
The first week of games in the BIG3 Basketball League took place at the Toyota Center, in Houston, Texas.

Week 2 (Chicago, IL)
The second week of games in the BIG3 Basketball League took place at the United Center, in Chicago, Illinois.

Week 3 (Oakland, CA)
The third week of games in the BIG3 Basketball League took place at the Oracle Arena, in Oakland, California.

Week 4 (Detroit, MI)
The fourth week of games in the BIG3 Basketball League took place at the Little Caesars Arena, in Detroit, Michigan.

Week 5 (Miami, FL)
The fifth week of games in the BIG3 Basketball League took place at the American Airlines Arena, in Miami, Florida.

Week 6 (Toronto, ON)
The sixth week of games in the BIG3 Basketball League took place at the Scotiabank Arena, in Toronto, Ontario.

Week 7 (Boston, MA)
The seventh week of games in the BIG3 Basketball League took place at the TD Garden, in Boston, Massachusetts.

Week 8 (Duluth, GA)
The eighth week of games in the BIG3 Basketball League took place at Infinite Energy Arena in the Atlanta suburb of Duluth, Georgia.

Standings

Notes
 Z clinched top seed
 Y clinched playoff spot

Playoffs

Week 9 (Dallas, TX)
The semifinals and bonus week of games in the BIG3 Basketball League took place at the American Airlines Center, in Dallas, Texas. The Ball Hogs, Ghost Ballers, Killer 3's, and Trilogy played in two games to determine the lower positions, but did not officially count in the standings.

Week 10 (Brooklyn, NY) 
The second BIG3 Championship game was played at the Barclays Center in Brooklyn, New York. Power defeated 3's Company for the title. 3 Headed Monsters beat Tri-State in the consolation game to finish in third place.

Bracket

Individual statistic leaders

Awards
The awards for the 2018 season were announced prior to the championship game.

 Most Valuable Player: Corey Maggette (Power)
 Coach of the Year: Nancy Lieberman (Power)
 Player Captain of the Year: Corey Maggette (Power)
 Defensive Player of the Year: Chris 'Birdman' Andersen (Power)
 4th Man: Andre Emmett (3's Company)
 Too Hard to Guard: Al Harrington (Trilogy)
 Best Trash Talker: Gary Payton (3-Headed Monsters)
 BIG Community Award: Ricky Davis (Ghost Ballers)

References

Big3
2018–19 in American basketball
Big